Colonel William Cansfield Gerard, 2nd Baron Gerard   (1 June 1851 – 30 July 1902) was a British Army officer and nobleman.

Biography
Gerard was born in 1851, the elder son of Robert Gerard, 1st Baron Gerard, by his wife Harriet Clifton. His father succeeded an elder brother as baronet in 1854, and in 1876 was raised to the peerage as Baron Gerard. William was educated at Oscott College, and succeeded his father as baron in 1887.

He was commissioned a lieutenant in the 2nd Life Guards. From 1899 to 1900 he served in South Africa during the Second Boer War, where he was and extra Aide-de-camp to General Sir Redvers Buller in Natal. For his service he was mentioned in despatches, received the Queen's South Africa Medal with six clasps, and was appointed a Companion of the Distinguished Service Order (DSO). He was lieutenant-colonel and Honorary Colonel of the Lancashire Hussars, a Yeomanry regiment.

Family
Gerard married, in 1877, Mary Milner, daughter of Henry Beilby Milner, of West Retford, a descendant of the Milner baronets. Their son Frederic John Gerard succeeded as Baron Gerard.

References

1851 births
1902 deaths
British Life Guards officers
Barons in the Peerage of the United Kingdom
Alumni of St Mary's College, Oscott
British Army personnel of the Second Boer War
Eldest sons of British hereditary barons